Gloria Dei Church, known locally as Old Swedes, is a historic church located in the Southwark neighborhood of Philadelphia, Pennsylvania, at 929 South Water Street, bounded by Christian Street on the north, South Christopher Columbus Boulevard (formerly Delaware Avenue) on the east, and Washington Avenue on the south. It was built between 1698 and 1700, making it the oldest church in Pennsylvania and second oldest Swedish church in the United States after Holy Trinity Church (Old Swedes) in Wilmington, Delaware.

The carpenters for the building were John Smart and John Buett and bricks were supplied by Richard Cantril. The church displays the English vernacular style of church design, which combines elements of the Medieval and Gothic styles. The church's vestry and entranceway were added in 1703 to buttress the walls, which had begun to buckle under the weight of the roof. The tower was added c.1733, and interior alterations were made in 1845, designed by Samuel Sloan.

The congregation was established on Tinicum Island in 1646. It moved to its present site in 1677, five years before the founding of the city of Philadelphia, and the graveyard around the church to about the same time. Formerly a Swedish Lutheran congregation, the church has been Episcopalian since 1845.

History

Gloria Dei is the oldest church in Pennsylvania and second oldest Swedish church in the United States after Holy Trinity Church (Old Swedes) in Wilmington, Delaware. Swedish pioneers of New Sweden were the first to settle the area in 1646. An existing blockhouse at Wicaco (now South Philadelphia), had been renovated for worship in 1677 and was used until the present church (built beginning in 1698) was consecrated on the First Sunday after Trinity, June 2, 1700. Colonial painter Gustavus Hesselius was a member here.

In 1703, Gloria Dei was the site of the first regular Lutheran ordination in the Americas, that of Justus Falckner, a German theology student. Jenny Lind sang here during one of her American tours. Hanging in the center aisle is a Swedish chandelier given by famous Swedish artist Carl Milles. Recollections of many Swedish royal and episcopal visits are treasured memories, including models of Fogel Grip and Kalmar Nyckel, the first Swedish ships to arrive in New Sweden.

The church has a collection of historical and religious artifacts the church has acquired over three centuries, including bronze crosses and 18th century Bibles in Swedish and English. In 1845, the formerly Swedish Lutheran congregation joined the Episcopal Church. Today the church is owned and maintained by its congregation of Episcopalians.

The church was designated a National Historic Site on November 17, 1942.  It is an affiliated area of the National Park Service under Independence National Historical Park.  The church site is owned and administered by the Corporation of Gloria Dei (Old Swedes') Church.  It was listed on the National Register of Historic Places on October 15, 1966.

Swedish pastors
 Andreas Rudman, 1697-1702
 Andreas Sandel, 1702-1719
 Jonas Lidman, 1719-1730
 Johan Eneberg, acting 1730-1733
 Johannes Dylander, 1737-1741
 Gabriel Näsman, 1743-1750
 Olof Parlin, 1750-1757
 Erik Nordenlind, acting 1757-1759
 Carl Magnus Wrangel, 1759-1768
 Anders Göransson, 1768-1779
 Matthias Hultgren, 1779-1786
 Nicholas Collin, 1786-1831
Source:

Cemetery

The church cemetery includes the following interments:
 Sven Gunnarsson (d. 1678), one of the first buried at the church, a founding father of the New Sweden colony.
 Andreas Rudman, pastor 1698-1702
 Johan Dylander, pastor 1737-1741
 John C. Hunterson (1841-1927), Civil War soldier and Medal of Honor recipient (issued August 2, 1897).
 William Irvine (1741–1804), Revolutionary War officer and physician.
 George Ord, Jr. (1781–1866), ornithologist.
 James Peale (1749–1831), Revolutionary War officer and artist (brother of Charles Willson Peale).
 Sarah Miriam Peale (1800–1885) portrait painter, daughter of James Peale.
 Alexander Wilson (1766–1813), ornithologist and illustrator.
 Amandus Johnson (1877–1974), Swedish-American scholar and founder of the American Swedish Historical Museum.
Peter Gunnarsson Rambo (1611–1698), Swedish immigrant who became known as the Father of New Sweden.

Gallery

See also

 List of the oldest buildings in Pennsylvania
 Laurentius Carels, Swedish American Lutheran pastor
 Holy Trinity Church (Old Swedes) in Wilmington, Delaware

References

External links

 
  NPS website: Gloria Dei Church National Historic Site
 
 Churches of New Sweden
 Gloria Dei (Old Swedes') Church Burial Ground at Find A Grave
 Digitized historical documents from Gloria Dei, on the Philadelphia Congregations website.

Churches in Philadelphia
Buildings and structures in Independence National Historical Park
South Philadelphia
Episcopal churches in Pennsylvania
New Sweden
Swedish-American culture in Pennsylvania
Churches completed in 1700
Churches on the National Register of Historic Places in Pennsylvania
Cemeteries on the National Register of Historic Places in Philadelphia
Properties of religious function on the National Register of Historic Places in Philadelphia
National Historic Sites in Pennsylvania
Tourist attractions in Philadelphia
1677 establishments in Pennsylvania
1942 establishments in Pennsylvania
Historic American Buildings Survey in Philadelphia
17th-century Episcopal church buildings
17th-century churches in the United States
18th-century churches in the United States
Colonial architecture in the United States
1700 establishments in Pennsylvania
Cemeteries in Philadelphia
Protected areas of Philadelphia